At the end of the Mexican War of Independence, the Army of the Three Guarantees ( or ) was the name given to the army after the unification of the Spanish troops led by Agustín de Iturbide and the Mexican insurgent troops of Vicente Guerrero, consolidating Mexico's independence from Spain. The decree creating this army appeared in the Plan de Iguala, which stated the three guarantees which it was meant to defend: religion, independence, and unity. Mexico was to be a Catholic empire, independent from Spain, and united against its enemies.

History
The Army of the Three Guarantees was created on February 24, 1821, and continued battling Spanish royalist forces which refused to accept Mexican independence. These battles continued until August 1821, when Iturbide and Spanish Viceroy Juan de O'Donojú signed the Treaty of Córdoba, virtually ratifying Mexico's independence. The Army was a decisive force during the Battle of Azcapotzalco. The victory in this last battle of the war cleared the way to Mexico City. On September 27, 1821, the Army of the Three Guarantees triumphantly entered Mexico City, led by Iturbide. The following day Mexico was declared independent.

By that time, the Army of the Three Guarantees was composed of 7,616 infantrymen, 7,755 cavalry, and 763 artillery with 68 cannons.

Generals

References 

Mexican War of Independence
1821 in Mexico
1821 in New Spain